Vitalstatistix may refer to:

Vitalstatistix (arts organisation), a women's theatre group in Port Adelaide, South Australia
Vitalstatistix (character), a character in Asterix comics